NXT UK TakeOver: Blackpool II was the third and final NXT UK TakeOver professional wrestling livestreaming event, and second and final TakeOver: Blackpool event, produced by WWE. It was held exclusively for wrestlers from the promotion's NXT UK brand division. The event aired exclusively on the WWE Network and took place on 12 January 2020 at the Empress Ballroom in Blackpool, Lancashire, England. It was the only NXT UK TakeOver to be held in 2020 due to the COVID-19 pandemic. It would be the final NXT UK TakeOver event as although WWE resumed live touring in July 2021 and with COVID travel restrictions being loosened, no further NXT UK TakeOver events were scheduled.

Five matches were contested at the event. In the main event, Walter defeated Joe Coffey by submission to retain the WWE United Kingdom Championship. In other matches, Gallus (Mark Coffey and Wolfgang) defeated Imperium (Fabian Aichner and Marcel Barthel) and Grizzled Young Veterans (Zack Gibson and James Drake), and Mark Andrews and Flash Morgan Webster in a 4-way tag team ladder match to retain the NXT UK Tag Team Championship, and Kay Lee Ray retained the NXT UK Women's Championship by defeating Toni Storm and Piper Niven in a triple threat match.

Production

Background 
TakeOver was a series of professional wrestling shows that began on 29 May 2014, when WWE's NXT brand held their second live special on the WWE Network. The NXT UK brand debuted in June 2018 and subsequently adopted the TakeOver name for their live WWE Network specials, beginning with NXT UK TakeOver: Blackpool in January 2019. Blackpool II was scheduled as the third NXT UK TakeOver event and was held on 12 January 2020. It was also the second in the TakeOver: Blackpool chronology, a subseries of TakeOvers held at the Empress Ballroom in Blackpool, Lancashire, England.

Storylines 

The card included five matches that resulted from scripted storylines. Wrestlers portrayed heroes, villains, or less distinguishable characters in scripted events that built tension and culminated in a wrestling match or series of matches. Results were predetermined by WWE's writers on the NXT UK brand, while storylines are produced on their weekly television programme, NXT UK.

On the 7 November episode of NXT UK, Mark Andrews & Flash Morgan Webster's match ended in a no contest after Gallus and Imperium interfered. On the 12 December episode, Gallus' title match against Imperium's Marcel Barthel and Fabian Aichner ended in a no contest after Mark Andrews, Flash Morgan Webster and Grizzled Young Veterans brawled. Then, Johnny Saint and Sid Scala came out and announced that Gallus will defend against Mark Andrews & Flash Morgan Webster, Grizzled Young Veterans and Imperium at TakeOver: Blackpool II in a ladder match.

On the 28 November episode of NXT UK, after Piper Niven's match against Jinny, Toni Storm returned and attacked Kay Lee Ray. Then on the 5 December episode, after Toni Storm's match with Killer Kelly, Ray attacked Storm and Niven came out and helped but Storm however said that she did not need Niven's help. On the 12 December episode, after Kay Lee Ray's match with Isla Dawn, Ray grabbed the mic and talked trash about Storm and Niven only for them to come out and Ray attacked both superstars. As Ray was leaving, Sid Scala announced that Ray will defend her title against Storm and Niven in a triple-threat match at TakeOver: Blackpool II.

Event

Preliminary matches 
In the opening bout, Trent Seven faced Eddie Dennis. Dennis performed a Neck Stop Driver on Seven to win. 

Next, Kay Lee Ray defended the NXT UK Women’s Championship against Toni Storm and Piper Niven. Storm performed a Frog Splash on Niven but Ray performed a Superkick on Storm. Ray pinned Niven to retain the title. 

After that, Tyler Bate faced Jordan Devlin. Bate performed a Corkscrew Senton Bomb on Devlin to win. 

Later, Gallus (Mark Coffey and Wolfgang) defended the NXT UK Tag Team Championship against Grizzled Young Veterans (Zack Gibson and James Drake), Mark Andrews and Flash Morgan Webster and Imperium (Fabian Aichner and Marcel Barthel) in a Ladder match. Coffey and Wolfgang retrieved the belts to retain the titles.

Main event 
In the main event, Walter defended the WWE United Kingdom Championship against Joe Coffey. Walter performed a Running Front Dropkick on the referee. Coffey performed a Powerbomb on Walter. Alexander Wolfe interfered and performed a Bicycle Kick on Coffey. Ilja Dragunov appeared and performed Torpedo Moscow on Wolfe. Walter performed a Clothesline on Dragunov. Walter threw Coffey into the steel steps and performed a Powerbomb onto the ring apron on Coffey. Walter performed a Short-Arm Clothesline on Coffey for a near-fall. Walter performed a Diving Splash on Coffey for a near-fall. Coffey performed a Discus Clothesline on Walter for a near-fall. Walter performed a Sleeper Suplex and two Powerbombs on Coffey. Walter forced Coffey to submit to a Side Headlock to retain the title. 

After the match, The Undisputed Era attacked Imperium. Roderick Strong performed a Jumping High Knee on Walter and Adam Cole performed a Superkick on Walter. Bobby Fish and Kyle O’Reilly performed Total Elimination on Walter. Cole performed a Last Shot on Walter.

Aftermath
TakeOver: Blackpool II would be the final NXT UK TakeOver event held to date. Another event, NXT UK TakeOver: Dublin, had been planned, but was ultimately cancelled due to the COVID-19 pandemic. The main NXT's TakeOver series was also discontinued in late 2021. Also, in September 2022, NXT UK went on hiatus and will relaunch as NXT Europe in 2023.

Results

References

External links
 

Blackpool
2020 WWE Network events
January 2020 events in the United Kingdom
Blackpool
WWE international
2020 in England